María Douglas (June 22, 1922 – December 17, 1973) was a Mexican stage and film actress.

Selected filmography
 Cinco fueron escogidos (1943)
 The White Monk (1945)
 Angelitos negros (1948)
 La casa chica (1950)
 La dama del alba (1950)
 Girls in Uniform (1951)
 Women's Prison (1951)
 Stolen Paradise (1951)
 The Absentee (1952)
 Forbidden Fruit (1953)
 The Unfaithful (1953)
 The Price of Living (1954)
 Cruz de amor (1970)

References

Bibliography
 Paco Ignacio Taibo. María Félix: 47 pasos por el cine. Bruguera, 2008.

External links

1922 births
1973 deaths
Mexican film actresses
Actresses from Mexico City
Mexican people of Irish descent
1973 suicides
Drug-related suicides in Mexico
Barbiturates-related deaths